Football at the 2010 Asian Games was held in Guangzhou, Guangdong, China from 7 to 25 November 2010. The opening match was played 5 days prior to the opening ceremony. In this tournament, 24 teams played in the men's competition, and 7 teams participated in women's competition.

Age limit for the men teams was under-23, same as the age limit in football competitions in Olympic Games, while three overage players are allowed among each squad.

Japan became the first ever nation that won both Gold medals of Men's and Women's tournament in an Asian Games.

Schedule

Medalists

Medal table

Draw
The draw ceremony for the team sports was held on 7 October 2010 in China. The teams were seeded based on their final ranking at the 2006 Asian Games.

Men

Group A
 
 
 
 

Group B
 
 
 
 

Group C
 
 
 
 

Group D
 
  Athletes from Kuwait
 
 

Group E
 
 
 
 

Group F
 *
 
 
 

* Iraq withdrew from the competition shortly after the draw and was replaced by Pakistan.

Women

Group A
 
 
 
 

Group B

Squads

Final standing

Men

Women

References

 Results on RSSSF (Men)
 Results on RSSSF (Women)

External links
 Official website

 
Asia
2010
2010
2010 Asian Games events